Jacob McArthur Mooney (born 1983) is a Canadian poet, blogger, and literary critic. He is most noted for his 2011 poetry collection Folk, which was a shortlisted Trillium Book Award finalist for English poetry in 2012.

Titles 
 The New Layman's Almanac (McClelland & Stewart, 2008)
 Folk (McClelland & Stewart, 2011)

References

21st-century Canadian poets
Canadian male poets
People from Lunenburg County, Nova Scotia
1983 births
Memorial University of Newfoundland alumni
Living people
21st-century Canadian male writers